Maria Trubnikova (1835–1897) was a Russian philanthropist and feminist. A notable philanthropist, she was also, alongside Anna Filosofova (1837–1912) and Nadezhda Stasova (1835–1895), one of the pioneer founders and leaders of the first organised Russian women's movement.

In 1863, Trubnikova, Stasova, and Anna Engelhardt founded the first Russian Women's Publishing Cooperative.

References
 Трубникова, Мария Васильевна // Энциклопедический словарь Брокгауза и Ефрона : в 86 т. (82 т. и 4 доп.). — СПб., 1890–1907.

Notes

1835 births
1897 deaths
Feminists from the Russian Empire
Russian women's rights activists
Philanthropists from the Russian Empire
19th-century people from the Russian Empire
Nobility from the Russian Empire
19th-century philanthropists